Kholvad House, which includes Flat 13, is a Johannesburg, South Africa building and landmark known for its role in the South African struggle for civil rights.  Its Flat 13 was the home of Robben Island prisoner Ahmed Kathrada for more than 16 years, including 1952 when he planned the Defiance Campaign, and Nelson Mandela used the home to see clients in 1960 when his law firm was shut down.

History
The home was built in 1942 by a group of Indians who from the peasant community of Kholvad. The home and others in the flats were built to raise funds to educate poor children in Kholvad and in South Africa. Dr. Yusuf Dadoo was one of the early Chairpersons of the Board of Trustees, and the Communist Party leader Rusty Bernstein was the building’s architect.

In his book “Long Walk to Freedom’, Nelson Mandela writes:

References

Historic buildings and structures in South Africa
Buildings and structures in Johannesburg
1942 establishments in South Africa